The 2010 Gloucester City Council election took place on 6 May 2010 to elect members of Gloucester City Council in England. Although two wards changed parties, one went from Labour to Conservative and the other went from Conservative to Labour, so there was no net change in the overall number of seats held by each party. The council remained under no overall control. After the election, Paul James continued to serve as leader of the council, leading a Conservative minority administration.

Results  

|}

Ward results

Abbey

Barnwood

Barton and Tredworth

Elmbridge

Grange

Hucclecote

Kingsholm and Wotton

Longlevens

Matson and Robinswood

Moreland

Podsmead

Quedgeley Fieldcourt

Quedgeley Severn Vale

Tuffley

Westgate

References

2010 English local elections
2010
2010s in Gloucestershire